Sony Ericsson W380 is a mobile phone that belongs to the Walkman series. This phone has multiple function for camera, such as negative, black and white or sepia.

External links 
 Tri-band clamshell Walkman phone with 3D gaming
 Phones - The best of Sony

W380
Mobile phones introduced in 2007